Sirak M. Sabahat (born December 5, 1981) is an Israeli actor. He is known for his role in the film Live and Become.

Filmography
Live and Become (2005)
Comme au cinéma (2005)
The Children of СССР (2007)

Further reading

References

External links
 

1981 births
Beta Israel
Israeli male film actors
Israeli male stage actors
Israeli male television actors
Jewish Israeli male actors
Living people
Israeli people of Ethiopian-Jewish descent